Montreal, White City is a Canadian drama film, released in 2016. The narrative feature film debut of documentarian and television director Bachir Bensaddek, the film was based on his own earlier theatrical play.

The film centres on Kahina (Karina Aktouf), a former Algerian pop star who abandoned the country during the Algerian Civil War and emigrated to Canada to live in peace and privacy. One Christmas Eve, however, she gets into a taxi driven by Amokrane (Rabah Aït Ouyahia), a more recent Algerian immigrant who recognizes her, forcing each to confront questions of personal identity and cultural assimilation as their personal stories and dramas collide.

Accolades
At the 5th Canadian Screen Awards in 2017, Bensaddek received a nomination for Best Adapted Screenplay.

References

External links
 

2016 films
2016 drama films
Canadian drama films
Quebec films
Films set in Montreal
Films shot in Montreal
French-language Canadian films
Arabic-language Canadian films
2010s Canadian films